Juan Bernardo Huyke Bozello (June 11, 1880 – December 17, 1961) served as acting governor of Puerto Rico several months in 1923.

Background
Huyke was born in Arroyo, Puerto Rico on June 11, 1880.  He was the son of Don Enrique Huyke and Doña Carmen Bozello.  His father, who was a principal of a school in Arroyo, named Huyke after his grandfather (Bernardo H. Huyke) who lived with family on the island of Curaçao in 1891. At the age of 21 Juan Bernardo Huyke began his career as an English teacher at a school in Arroyo. 

He was an attorney, writer, publisher, educator, and statesman. He served as Puerto Rico's Superintendent of Schools from 1908 until 1910. As superintendent, he was one of the first people to promote bilingual education. Huyke Bozello was president of the American Red Cross in Puerto Rico. He served in the Puerto Rico House of Representatives from 1912 to 1920, and became Commissioner of Public Instruction in 1921 until 1930.

For several months in 1923, Huyke served as interim Governor of Puerto Rico between the administrations of Emmet Montgomery Reily and Horace Mann Towner. He was the second native Puerto Rican to serve as interim Governor of Puerto Rico, the first was Juan Ponce de Leon II. From 1935 to 1945 Huyke was Chairman of the Puerto Rico Civil Service Commission.

In 1950, Huyke was the superintendent of the Bayamón school district. 

Juan B. Huyke died on December 17, 1961 in San Juan, Puerto Rico.

He was the father of sports journalist Emilio Huyke.

Publications
In 1932, Huyke published El Pais (The Country) a pro-statehood newspaper that represented many conservative views.

Huyke wrote and published several books, among his popular sellers were Children and Schools , Advice Our Youth, Stories of Puerto Rico, If I Were 21 Years  old, Verse of Hector, The Small Cause, The Antillean Agony, and How I Educated My Son.

References

External links

 

|-

|-

|-

1880 births
1961 deaths
20th-century American politicians
American Red Cross personnel
American school superintendents
Governors of Puerto Rico
People from Arroyo, Puerto Rico
Secretaries of Education of Puerto Rico
Speakers of the House of Representatives of Puerto Rico